Hypselomus cristatus is a species of beetle in the family Cerambycidae, and the only species in the genus Hypselomus. It was described by Perty in 1832.

References

Onciderini
Beetles described in 1832